East Karelian concentration camps were a set of concentration camps operated by the Finnish government in the areas of the Soviet Union occupied by the Finnish military administration during the Continuation War. These camps were organized by the armed forces supreme commander Carl Gustaf Emil Mannerheim. The camps were intended to hold Russian detainees for future exchange with the Finnic population from the rest of Russia. The mortality rate of civilians in the camps was high due to famine and disease: by some estimates, 4,279 civilians died in these camps, meaning a rough mortality rate of 17%.

Russian population
Significant numbers of Soviet civilians were interred in the concentration camps. These were primarily Russian children and elderly, as almost all of the working age male and female population were either drafted or evacuated by the Soviet government. Only a third of the original population of 470,000 remained in East Karelia when the Finnish army arrived, and half of them were Karelians. About 30 percent (24,000) of the remaining Russian population were confined in camps; six-thousand of them were Soviet refugees captured while they awaited transportation over Lake Onega, and 3,000 were from the southern side of the River Svir. The first of the camps were set up on 24 October 1941 in Petrozavodsk. During the spring and summer of 1942, about 3,500 detainees died of malnutrition. During the second half of 1942, the number of detainees dropped quickly to 15,000 as people were released to their homes or were resettled to the "safe" villages, and only 500 more people died during the last two years of war, as the food shortages were alleviated. During the following years, the Finnish authorities detained several thousand more civilians from areas with reported partisan activity, but as the releases continued the total number of detainees remained at 13,000–14,000. According to the records the total number of deaths among the interned civilians and POWs was 4,361 (earlier estimates varied between 4,000 and 7,000), mostly from hunger during the spring and summer of 1942.

Timeline
The first camp was set up on 24 October 1941, in Petrozavodsk. The two largest groups were 6,000 Russian refugees and 3,000 inhabitants from the southern bank of the River Svir who were forcibly evacuated because of the close proximity of the front line. Of these interned civilians it has been estimated that 4361 perished mainly due to malnourishment, 90 percent of them during the spring and summer of 1942.

See also 
 Soviet prisoners of war in Finland

References

Bibliography
 

World War II concentration camps
Soviet prisoners of war
Finland–Soviet Union relations
Continuation War